Budharaja is a small  hillock in Sambalpur, Odisha, India. There is a Shiva temple situated on the top of hill and middle of the sambalpur city. A concrete road goes to the temple from the base. The locality on the eastern side of the hillock is known as Budharaja due to its proximity to the hillock. Currently a Watch Tower is under construction to increase tourism.

Gallery

 References

Sambalpur
Geography of Sambalpur
Tourist attractions in Sambalpur